Kingdom of Tanur (Vettathunadu, Vettom, Tanur Swaroopam, Prakashabhu, Kingdom of Light) was one of the numerous feudal principalities on Malabar Coast during the Middle Ages. It was ruled by a Hindu dynasty, claiming Kshatriya status, known as Tanur dynasty. The kingdom comprised parts of the coastal Taluks of Tirurangadi, Tirur, and Ponnani taluks in present-day Malappuram district and included places such as Tanur, Tirur (Trikkandiyur) and Chaliyam. The coastal villages of Kadalundi and Chaliyam in the southernmost area of Kozhikode district was also under Tanur Swaroopam.

The king of Vettattnad was a long time feudatory of the Zamorin of Calicut. With the arrival of the Portuguese in Malabar, the rulers of Vettathunad began to play the Portuguese and Calicut against each other. They were one of the first vassals of Calicut to stand up against the Zamorin with the Portuguese assistance. Francis Xavier had visited Tanur in 1546 and visited the Keraladeshpuram Temple at Tanur. Subsequently, a Vettom king fell in offers of the Portuguese and converted to Christianity in 1549. This king allowed the construction of the strategic fortress at Chaliyam.

Since, part of the Chovvaram (Sukapuram) village in the old 64 villages of Nambudiris, the queen of Cochin adopted some Vettom princes in 17th century, which lead to tensions in the Malabar Coast.

The royal family became extinct on the death of the last king, on 24 May 1793. Subsequently, the kingdom passed to English East India Company and the temple of the royal family was transferred to the Zamorin of Calicut in 1842.

The Vettathunad rulers were famous patrons of arts and learning. A Vettathunad ruler is said to have introduced innovations in Kathakali which have come to known as the Vettathu Sambradayam. The famous poets Thunchaththu Ramanujan Ezhuthachan, who is also known as The Father of Modern Malayalam, and Vallathol Narayana Menon, who is also the founder of Kerala Kalamandalam,  were born in Vettathunad. The Kerala school of astronomy and mathematics flourished between the 14th and 16th centuries. In attempting to solve astronomical problems, the Kerala school independently created a number of important mathematics concepts, including series expansion for trigonometric functions.

Etymology and dominions

The name "Tanur Swaroopam (Tanni-ur Swaroopam)" is derived from three Malayalam language words. "Tanni" refers to the tree bastard myrobalan, "Ur" refers to the "Village" and "Swaroopam" to "Kingdom". The kingdom was called in literary works Prakasa Bhu (The Kingdom of Light) and its ruler Prakasa Bhu Palan. The king was called "raja" or "thampuran" or "naduvazhi".

In the time of the arrival of British, according to William Logan, the kingdom ("nadu") was divided into 21 "amsoms" as shown below(A main bazaar in each amsom is given in bracket).

Anantavur (Cherulal), Chennara, Clari (Kuttippala), Iringavur, Kalpakanchēri (Kadungathukundu), Kanmanam (Thuvvakkad), Mangalam, Mēlmuri, Niramaruthūr, Ozhūr, Pachattiri, Pallippuram, Pariyāpuram, Ponmundam (Vailathoor), Purathur, Rayiramangalam, Thalakkad (Betteth Puthiya Angadi), Thanalur, Trikkandiyoor (Tirur), Triprangode, and Vettom.

Political history

Ancient era

The ancient port of Tyndis which was located on the northern side of Muziris, as mentioned in the Periplus of the Erythraean Sea, was somewhere around Tanur. Its exact location is a matter of dispute. The suggested locations are Ponnani, Tanur, Beypore-Chaliyam-Kadalundi-Vallikkunnu, and Koyilandy. Note that Ponnani was the southern end of the kingdom of Tanur, while Beypore-Chaliyam-Kadalundi-Vallikkunnu region was at the northern end of Vettathunadu. Tyndis was a major center of trade, next only to Muziris, between the Cheras and the Roman Empire. Pliny the Elder (1st century CE) states that the port of Tyndis was located at the northwestern border of Keprobotos (Chera dynasty). The North Malabar region, which lies north of the port at Tyndis, was ruled by the kingdom of Ezhimala during Sangam period. According to the Periplus of the Erythraean Sea, a region known as Limyrike began at Naura and Tyndis. However the Ptolemy mentions only Tyndis as the Limyrike'''s starting point. The region probably ended at Kanyakumari; it thus roughly corresponds to the present-day Malabar Coast. The value of Rome's annual trade with the region was estimated at around 50,000,000 sesterces. Pliny the Elder mentioned that Limyrike was  prone by pirates. The Cosmas Indicopleustes mentioned that the Limyrike was a source of peppers.Das, Santosh Kumar (2006). The Economic History of Ancient India. Genesis Publishing Pvt Ltd. p. 301.

Before the advent of the Portuguese
The history of Vettathunad before the arrival of the Portuguese Armadas is largely obscure. The origin of the dynasty is often dates back to the Chera times in legendary traditions. The Chera Kingdom was disintegrated in the early 12th century. Most of their Nair governors and vassals proclaimed independence during this period of extreme instability.

The ruler of Vettam was one of the earliest Nair chiefteen in Malabar to acknowledge the suzerainty of the Zamorin of Calicut over them. The neighbouring states of Parappanad and Beypore also became vassals of Calicut one by one. Calicut annexed these regions probably in between 1340 and 1350 AD. The very significant fact is that, the major purpose of this conquest was not the expansion of land, but for capturing strategical ports and acquiring fertile paddy fields of the Bharathappuzha river valley. Even as the royal houses of Parappanad, Valluvanad, and Vettathunad, rapidly achieve commercial prosperity as a result of geographical access to maritime commerce, Eranad literally suffocates from being cut off from the access to the Arabian Sea. And the land north of the Nila river valley was not so fertile in paddy production. The Zamorin himself prepared and attended a post-occupation coronation function of the Vettathunad king. No other feudatory under Zamorins was seen conducting such a function. This may be viewed as the Zamorin’s strategy to establish his supremacy on the ports, Nila river system and its valley.

The second in line successors of Zamorin, the Eralpads, controlled the banks of river Nila as a governor after the occupation of the territory once belonged to Vettattnad and other principalities. In the following Thirunavaya Wars between the Cochin-Valluvanad alliance and Calicut, the rulers of Vettattnad supported the Zamorin. As the Thirunavaya was captured after the war, Zamorin proclaimed himself as Protector and took over sole right of conducting the famous Mamankam festival. During the Mamankam festivals all his feudatories including the Vettam king were used to send flags to Thirunavaya as a symbol of regard to the Zamorin.

 In the Mamankam festivals the king of Vettam had the right to stand on the right of Zamorin of Calicut whereas the Shah Bandar Koya of Calicut stood in his left side.
 After the puberty ceremony (the thirandu-kalyanam) of the Zamorin princess (Thampurati), the Zamorin himself selects a suitable husband for his "anathiraval". They were generally chosen, for political and strategic reasons from the dynasties of Vettom, Berypore, Kurumburanad and Kodungallur
 As a part of the coronation ceremonies (the Ari-yittu-vazhcha) of a new Zamorin, after the death of his uncle, he enters the pulakuli pond hand in hand with the raja Punnattur. Till, 1793, Vettom king has also taken part in this ceremony, Punnattur king taking his hold of his left hand and Vettatt of the right.
 The lord of Kalpakanchery (Kalpakancheri was in Vettathunad) was used present at the coronation of a new Zamorin.

In the Portuguese era

The rulers of Tanur were the allies of the Portuguese in 16th and 17th centuries. The famous Portuguese Armada led by Vasco da Gama landed in Malabar in 1498. Soon, the Zamorin of Calicut expelled the Portuguese from his capital and territories. The Portuguese quickly found local allies among some of the city-states on the Malabar coast which had long grated under Zamorin's dominance. Cochin, Cannanore and Quilon opened their ports and invited the Portuguese sailors. Vettathuraja, who was in a partial subjection to the Calicut at the time, also saw an opportunity to break away. Moreover, he, like the kings of Beypore and Chalium (Parappanad) secretly opposed the policy of the Zamorin over the Kingdom of Cochin. However, the Tanur forces under the king fought for the Zamorin of Calicut in the Battle of Cochin (1504)

The Defection of Tanur
After the Raid on Cranganore, in October 1504, Lopo Soares de Albergaria of the Sixth Indian Armada of the Portuguese received reports of an urgent message from the Vettathuraja. The Vettathuraja had come to loggerheads with his overlord, the Zamorin of Calicut, and offered to place him under Portuguese suzerainty instead, in return for military assistance. He reports that a Calicut column, led by the Zamorin himself, had been assembled in a hurry to try to save Cranganore from the Portuguese, but that he managed to block its passage at Tanur. Lopo Soares immediately dispatches Pêro Rafael with a caravel and a sizeable Portuguese armed force to assist Tanur. The Zamorin's column is defeated and dispersed soon after its arrival.

The Raid on Cranganore and the Defection of Tanur were serious setbacks to the Zamorin, pushing the frontline north and effectively placing the Vembanad lagoon out of the Zamorin's reach. Any hopes the Zamorin had of quickly resuming his attempts to capture Cochin via the backwaters are effectively dashed. No less importantly, the battles at Cranganore and Tanur, which involved significant numbers of Malabari captains and troops, clearly demonstrated that the Zamorin was no longer feared in the region. The Battle of Cochin had broken his authority. Cranganore and Vettathunad showed that Malabaris were no longer afraid of defying his authority and taking up arms against him. A new chapter was being opened on the Malabar Coast.

On 31 December 1504, setting out from Cochin, the Sixth India Armada of the Portuguese under the command of Lopo Soares de Albergaria first headed north, intending to dock briefly at the port of Ponnani, to pay his respects to his new ally, the king of Vettom. While negotiating entry at the port, Lopo Soares received a message, and it led him to the Battle of Pandarane (Koyilandi). However in the same year king of Vettom invited the Portuguese to his kingdom, and small Portuguese force actually came to Vettom. But the king as not bold enough for an open defiance, and he sent his new allies back with numerous presents and a promise of secret support against the Zamorin.

Barbosa (1516) describes:“Further on … are two places of Moors (Mappilas) 5 leagues from one another. One is called Paravanor, and the other Tanor, and inland from these towns is a lord (Vettathuraja) to whom they belong; and he (Vettathuraja) has many Nairs, and sometimes he rebels against the King of Calicut (Samoothiri). In these towns there is much shipping and trade, for these Moors is great merchants”Correa (1521) was very interested in the Kingdom, as he says:”…and the  lord of Tanor (Vettathuraja), who carried on a great sea-trade with many ships, which trafficked all about the coast of India with passes from our (Portuguese) Governors, for he only dealt in wares of the country; and thus he was the greatest possible friend of the Portuguese, and those who went to his dwelling were entertained with the greatest honour, as if they had been his brothers. In fact for this purpose he kept houses fitted up, and both cots and bed-steads furnished in our fashion, with tables and chairs and casks of wine, with which he regaled our people, giving them entertainments and banquets, insomuch that it seemed as if he were going to become a Christian…”However, the allegiance of the Muslim merchants in the region still resided with the Zamorin of Calicut. It was a brave Tānūr merchant who sailed his 8 ships and 40 boats before the eyes of the Portuguese viceroy Duarte de Menezes from Calicut to the Red Sea in 1523. At that time, the Portuguese were very weak in the region to react. The Portuguese viceroy Vasco da Gama died in December 1524. Soon after, some 100 ships, with the support of Zamorin, attacked the Jewish and Christian settlements in Kodungallūr. This attacking Moplah party included men from Tānūr and Chāliyam.

In 1528, when a Portuguese ship was wrecked off his coast, the king of Vettom gave shelter to crew and refused to surrender them to the Zamorin. But, Tohfut-ul-Mujahideen says that the ship was a French:

"And in the year (A.H.) 935, a ship belonging to the Franks was wrecked off Tanoor. Now the Ray of that place affording aid to the crew, the Zamorin sent a messenger to him demanding of him the surrender of the Franks who composed it, together with such parts of the cargo of the ship as had been saved, but that chieftain having refused compliance with this demand, a treaty of peace was entered into with the Franks by him; and from this time the subjects of the Ray of Tanoor traded under the protection of the passes of the Franks."

Then, Nuno da Cunha's envoys entered into a successful intrigue with king of Vettam (the same king to be converted Christianity later) to make a fort near Ponnāni River (Bharathappuzha), in the opposite bank (north) of Ponnāni town. However the Portuguese were not successful as the ships bringing building materials were destroyed when trying to cross the dangerous river mouth and a storm.

In 1529 being joined by six brigantines and a galley, with 100 chosen men, commanded by Christopher de Melo, the united squadron of Lope Vaz de Sampayo took a very large ship laden with pepper in the river Chale, though defended by numerous artillery and 800 men.

Battles at Chaliyam Fort

The strategic Chaliyam -also known as Challe- was a Portuguese garrison between 1531–1571. Chāliyam was a strategic site, for it was only 10 km south of Calicut and was situated in a river that falls into the sea about three leagues from Calicut, which is navigable by boats all the way to the foot of the Ghat mountains.

In 1531, the same 'to be converted' Vettam king enabled the construction of an important Portuguese fort in Chāliyam island as a part of a peace treaty between the Zamorin and the Portuguese viceroy (the governor-general) Nuno da Cunha. Being perplexed by the great losses the Samoothiri was continually sustaining through the Portuguese superiority at sea, so he made overtures towards an accommodation and under Nuno da Cunha the Portuguese were retaining their lost supremacy. 

Chalium was controlled by the Parappanad raja (aka king of Chalium) called Urinama. Like the Vettathuraja he also helped the Portuguese. Parappanaduraja and Vettathuraja were anxious to throw off their subjection to the Samoothiri and to enter into alliance with the Portuguese, in hopes of becoming rich by participating in their trade.

Immediately upon procuring the consent of the Zamorin to construct the fort, Nuno da Cunha set out from Goa with 150 sail of vessels, in which were 3000 Portuguese troops and 1000 native Lascarines. So much diligence was used in carrying on the work, even the gentlemen participating in the labour, that in twenty-six days it was in a defensible situation, being surrounded by a rampart nine feet thick and of sufficient height, strengthened by towers and bastions or bulwarks at proper places. It's said that the Portuguese destroyed a nearby mosque and used its stones to build the fort! The rectangular shaped fort was built to decline the Arab sea trade in the region. In 1532 with the help of the king of Vettam a chapel was built at Chaliyam, together with a house for the commander, barracks for the soldiers, and store-houses for trade. Diego de Pereira, who had negotiated the treaty with the Zamorin, was left in command of this new fortress, with a garrison of 250 men; and Manuel de Sousa had orders to secure its safety by sea, with a squadron of twenty-two vessels.

The Samoothiri soon repented of having allowed this fort to be built in his dominions, and used ineffectual endeavours to induce the Parappanatturaja, Caramanlii (King of Beypore?) (Some records say that Vettathuraja was also with them) to break with the Portuguese, even going to war against them.

Samoothiri's first attempt (1538–40)
But within seven years, in 1538, the Zamorin attacked Vettattnād and Chāliyam (Parappanad). The king of Parappanād made an unconditional peace with Zamorin. The king of Vettam, after a protracted fight, was compelled to surrender some of his lands near Ponnāni and Chāliyam island. But Portuguese fort could not be destroyed. The Zamorin now had his absolute control over the area around the fort. Only by 1540, the Zamorin entered into an agreement with the Portuguese and stopped the war. But the skirmishes continued in the seas by Moplah navigators based at Ponnāni.

Conversion of Vettathuraja
From 1545, the Vettathuraja banked on the Portuguese to help him solidify his position vis-à-vis the Samoothiri. In his experience in dealing with the Portuguese, he presumed that converting to Christianity was the way to express his political alliance and client relationship. Vettathuraja announced to the Portuguese religious specialists that his conversion had to remain secret in order not to lose his honour or his Caste. In fact, it was his close political (and religious ties) to the Portuguese that may have brought him certain disadvantages on the complicated checkerboard of power relations on the Malabar Coast. Jesuit records claim that the Vettathuraja thus played his own double game with the Portuguese and with the other rival little (and bigger) kings in the region. The Vettathuraja demanded to preserve after conversion certain external signs of his caste, such as the Poonul, as well as other Hindu customs. The unanimous opinion of the ecclesiastics in Goa was that such dissimulation went against the decisions of the Church Fathers. The theologians in Goa were puzzled and undecided about the question as to whether or not to permit Vettathuraja to continue wearing, the external signs of a Brahman.

An urgent ad hoc Consultation headed by the Governor, Jorge Cabral, debated this issue and drafted some of the first typically accommodationist propositions. It was the Bishop, Juan de Albuquerque, who furnished Biblical examples on behalf of such accommodating practices.

Tanur ( Tanore or Banor) town was one of the oldest Portuguese settlements in Kerala. In 1546, Saint Francis Xavier visited Tanur.

In 1549 the King of Vettam fell in the offers of the Portuguese and officially converted to Christianity. The conversion took place in Goa in a festive mood led by Jesuit padre named António Gomes. António Gomes was a Catholic missionary arrived from Goa in October 1548. The offer was to make him the king of Kērala by defeating the Zamorin. The poor king believed them. At the time, the choice to convert Vettathuraja whose tiny realm was jammed between Samoothiri to the north, mostly hostile to Portuguese, and the fortress of Chaliyam guarded by Portuguese Captain Diego de Pereira and a handful of soldiers appeared both practical and providential. Jesuit records says that Vettathuraja himself begged to be converted and asked for a Christian priest to reside in Tanur. After the conversion, he was called Dom João. Vettathuraja was not permitted in Goa. After various spectacular or secret negotiations, confinements and escapes, Vettathuraja did finally visit Goa in October 1549. He received a sumptuous and ostentatious reception. He was paraded in procession through Goa, accompanied by various musical instruments such as trombetas, kettledrums and shawms, artillery discharges, from church bells, Vettathuraja was dressed up by the Portuguese as they felt fitting for the king.

That is, as a Portuguese fidalgo, “in honourable and rich clothes, with a very rich sword fastened [around the waist], with a rich dagger, one golden chain, black velvet slippers, a black velvet hat with a printed design".

But, a few days after, the king returned to Hinduism saying he did not have any gain. Once he regained his kingdom loaded with Portuguese gifts, Vettathuraja doffed his Portuguese clothes and in the long run disappointed the Governor, Jorge Cabral and the Jesuits. It was the politics of pepper that undid his friendship with the Portuguese. On 21 February 1550, Cabral wrote to the king of Portugal Dom João III doubting that Vettathuraja converted sincerely, “Jesuits who had so much confidence in conversion of Vettathuraja confess that they were deceived, but by caution, I have to dissemble with him". In addition, he cautioned that “the conversion to Christianity might produce "discord" between the Samoothiri and Kochi and endanger the regular procurement of pepper in Kerala".

In fact, the Fourth Pepper War broke out sometime before June (1550) over a disputed territory—the island of Varutela—between the King of Kochi and the king of Vadakkumkur. A series of bloody encounters ensued and the Samoothiri allied with the Vettathuraja on the side of the king of Vadakkumkur were opposed to the King of Kochi and the Portuguese. After negotiations, rendered even more complicated by the appointment of the new Portuguese Viceroy, Dom Affonso de Noronha, the conflict remained unsettled and the amuck runners of the deceased King of Vadakkumkur wreaked havoc in the town of Kochi. Consequently, the cargo of pepper was not sent to Lisbon until the late February 1551.

Roughly from April until September 1549, Gomes partly resided in Tanur, and partly travelled southwards along the Malabar Coast. He had been officially sent by the bishop, Juan de Albuquerque, to instruct the Vettathuraja reputed to have been secretly converted to Christianity the previous year (1548).

By 1549, the situation had somewhat changed, the Vettathuraja was secretly converted by the vicar in Chaliyam, João Soares, and the Franciscan Frey Vicente de Lagos, who gave the neophyte a metal crucifix to hang onto his thread, "hidden on his chest".

And while all went just fine for António Gomes who was allowed to build the church in the town, to baptise the Vettathuraja’s wife as Dona Maria, and to perform Christian marriage rites for the kingly couple—all this was done in secret, "ocultamente".

When Lopo Soares arrived at Cochin (1553) after his victory over the Samoothiri the Vettathuraja sent a complain to him against the Samoothiri by ambassadors, begging for peace and help against the Samoothiri, having fallen out with him for reasons that touched the service of the King of Portugal.

In 1569 and 1570 there were again wars with the Portuguese and Zamorin's forces at Chāliyam fort. In these wars the notorious Moplah dacoit Kutti Pōker lost his life in his fight against the Portuguese at Chāliyam fort.

Samoothiri's second attempt (1571)
In 1571, the Zamorin got a fresh chance against the Portuguese. He began a siege to capture the Chāliyam fort with help of the Moplahs from the surroundings on Sufur 14 or 15 of that year. The Moplah admiral Pattu Kunnhāli (Kunnhāli Marakkār III) led the navy of the Zamorin in the siege. Moplahs from Ponnani, Punur, Tanur, Parappanangadi were in the fleet. The Portuguese lost the war. Many of their soldiers died inside the fortress. The seizing force had dug many trenches around the fortress. The Zamorin spent great amount of money in the siege. At the end of the two months of siege, Zamorin himself came to Chalium from Ponnani and began to command. The Portuguese were starving inside the garrison. The food materials sent from Cochin and Cannanore were blocked long before it reached.

After two months of siege, on the midnight of 15 September 1571, the Portuguese led by Athed surrendered to the alliance. They agreed empty the fortress on the condition that no one will be harmed. The Vettam king had to escort the Portuguese in their return journey to Tanur. Then they were sent to Cochin. It was too late for the backup from Goa.

The Zamorin destroyed the fort and the chapel leaving not one stone upon another which was his greatest problem ever since its construction in 1531. He sent most of the debris to Calicut and he gave that portion of land to build a new mosque. And Zamorin gave Kottaparamba and surrounding areas, as earlier decided, to the king of Parappanād (aka king of Chalium), his ally in the siege.

Antonio Fernandes de Chalium (Chale) held an important command under Portuguese generals, and was raised to the dignity of a Knight of the military Order of Christ. He was a convert from Chalium (Chale). Killed in action in 1571, Antonio Fernandes received a state funeral at Goa.

The Portuguese sailors burned Chāliyam town in 1572 as revenge.

Post-Portuguese history
By 17th century, the Portuguese authority on the Malabar coast significantly reduced with emergence of the Dutch. Soon the small principalities in the region became puppets in the hands of the two Colonial powers and fought each other.
 In 1658 the crown of Cochin became vacant and five princes from Tānūr dynasty and Aroor dynasty were adopted to the palace by the regent of Cochin, Queen Gangādhara Lakshmi (1656–1658), and were given the right to succeed. This regent Queen was under the influence of the Portuguese and later the eldest member of the adoptees from Tanur, Rama Varma (1658–1662), was crowned. This incidence of adoption is mentioned in some of the local folk tales. But Henric Vanrid has stated that the number of adoptions as four. Two of the five adopted were from Tanur, but there is no hint of how many people were adopted from Aroor and what happened to them later. But, nine of them survived to be kings.

But, an elder branch (mūtta tāvazhi) of the Cochin dynasty itself ignored that adoptions and appealed to the Zamorin of Calicut for help. The leader of the elder branch was the dispossessed prince Vīra Kērala Varma. The Zamorin decided to help the elder branch and Āditya Varma, king of Vadakkumkūr, king of Edappally and chief of Pāliyam rallied around the Zamorin in support of the elder branch's dispossessed prince. The king of Purakkad supported the ruling Tānūr princes. On the advice of the chief of Pāliyam, the dispossessed prince set sail to Colombo in Ceylon and asked help from the Dutch governor, Joan Maetsuycker, against the Portuguese-supported ruling princes. Later he sought exile in Colombo. The Dutch now found a huge chance of getting a major say in the politics of Malabar. In 1661, the Dutch led the allies of the dispossessed prince, with the armies of Zamorin of Calicut, against the Portuguese and the ruling Cochin king (Tānūr adoptee). The city of Cochin was attacked and the battle resulted in a disastrous failure of the Portuguese and Cochin rulers. Three of the Tānūr princes including Rama Varma killed in the war, Rani Gangadharalakshmi was sent to prison and the ruling king escaped to Eranākulam where he was given refuge by the king of Purakkad. After the death of Rama Varma and the other adopted prince Goda Varma (1662–1663), only survivor from Tanur, was crowned. On 7 January 1663, the Dutch attacked Cochin Port again and the prince surrendered to the Dutch. Vīra Kērala Varma (1663–1687) later crowned as the king of Cochin by the Dutch.

With the eclipse of the Portuguese influence in Malabar, Kingdom of Tanur reduced into the status of one of the numerous petty states in the region. In the 18th century, Kingdom of Mysore expanded their territory to the Malabar Coast and Tanur royal family lost many of its members during the invasion of Mysore. By the treaty of Seringapatam Mysore ceded Malabar to the English East India Company. On 14 August 1792, a minister of Tanur took over the kingdom for his king from the East India Company. By the death of the Vettom king on 24 May 1793 the Tanur dynasty came to an end. That was the time when the Joint Commissioners were doing the revenue settlements of the kingdom as the beginning of the British occupation in Malabār. Since there is no heir to the throne, the British took over the rule again and soon absorbed Tanur to the newly formed Malabar District. The temple of the Tanur royal family was transferred to the Zamorin of Calicut in 1842.

Ponnani Canal
Ponnani Canal was constructed for the transportation of goods from Ponnani to Tirur Railway Station. Here is a description about the Ponnani Canal by Basel Mission employees at Codacal.

Kerala school of astronomy and mathematics

The Kerala school of astronomy and mathematics flourished between the 14th and 16th centuries. In attempting to solve astronomical problems, the Kerala school independently created a number of important mathematics concepts, including series expansion for trigonometric functions. Their work, completed two centuries before the invention of calculus in Europe, provided what is now considered the first example of a power series (apart from geometric series). However, they did not formulate a systematic theory of differentiation and integration, nor is there any direct evidence of their results being transmitted outside Kerala. Quote: "It is not unusual to encounter in discussions of Indian mathematics such assertions as that "the concept of differentiation was understood [in India] from the time of Manjula (... in the 10th century)" [Joseph 1991, 300], or that "we may consider Madhava to have been the founder of mathematical analysis" (Joseph 1991, 293), or that Bhaskara II may claim to be "the precursor of Newton and Leibniz in the discovery of the principle of the differential calculus" (Bag 1979, 294). ... The points of resemblance, particularly between early European calculus and the Keralese work on power series, have even inspired suggestions of a possible transmission of mathematical ideas from the Malabar coast in or after the 15th century to the Latin scholarly world (e.g., in (Bag 1979, 285)). ... It should be borne in mind, however, that such an emphasis on the similarity of Sanskrit (or Malayalam) and Latin mathematics risks diminishing our ability fully to see and comprehend the former. To speak of the Indian "discovery of the principle of the differential calculus" somewhat obscures the fact that Indian techniques for expressing changes in the Sine by means of the Cosine or vice versa, as in the examples we have seen, remained within that specific trigonometric context.  The differential "principle" was not generalized to arbitrary  functions—in fact, the explicit notion of an arbitrary function, not to mention that of its
derivative or an algorithm for taking the derivative, is irrelevant here" Quote: "How close did Islamic and Indian scholars come to inventing the calculus? Islamic scholars nearly developed a general formula for finding integrals of polynomials by A.D. 1000—and evidently could find such a formula for any polynomial in which they were interested.  But, it appears, they were not interested in any polynomial of degree higher than four, at least in any of the material that has come down to us.  Indian scholars, on the other hand, were by 1600 able to use ibn al-Haytham's sum formula for arbitrary integral powers in calculating power series for the functions in which they were interested.  By the same time, they also knew how to calculate the differentials of these functions.  So some of the basic ideas of calculus were known in Egypt and India many centuries before Newton.  It does not appear, however, that either Islamic or Indian mathematicians saw the necessity of connecting some of the disparate ideas that we include under the name calculus.  They were apparently only interested in specific cases in which these ideas were needed.There is no danger, therefore, that we will have to rewrite the history texts to remove the statement that Newton and Leibniz invented the calculus.  They were certainly the ones who were able to combine many differing ideas under the two unifying themes of the derivative and the integral, show the connection between them, and turn the calculus into the great problem-solving tool we have today."

The Kerala school has made a number of contributions to the fields of infinite series and calculus. These include the following (infinite) geometric series:

The Kerala school made intuitive use of mathematical induction, though the inductive hypothesis was not yet formulated or employed in proofs. They used this to discover a semi-rigorous proof of the result:

for large n.

The Tantrasangraha-vakhya gives the series in verse, which when translated to mathematical notation, can be written as:

where, for  the series reduce to the standard power series for these trigonometric functions, for example:

(The Kerala school did not use the "factorial" symbolism.)

The Kerala school made use of the rectification (computation of length) of the arc of a circle to give a proof of these results. (The later method of Leibniz, using quadrature (i.e. computation of area under the arc of the circle), was not yet developed.)

Their rational approximation of the error for the finite sum of their series are of particular interest.  For example, the error, (for n odd, and i = 1, 2, 3) for the series:

They manipulated the terms, using the partial fraction expansion of : to obtain a more rapidly converging series for :

They used the improved series to derive a rational expression,  for  correct up to nine decimal places, i.e. . They made use of an intuitive notion of a limit to compute these results. The Kerala school mathematicians also gave a semi-rigorous method of differentiation of some trigonometric functions, though the notion of a function, or of exponential or logarithmic functions, was not yet formulated.

 Veṭṭathu Tradition (Kathakali) 
The so-called "Veṭṭathu Tradition" or Veṭṭathu Sampradayam of the Kerala dance drama Kathakali is attributed to a Raja of Veṭṭathunāṭu (1630–1640). The Raja introduced several important developments into the presentation of Kathakali;

 Introduction of two professional background singers
 Introduction of chengilas (cymbals) to beat the tala (rhythm)
 Introduction of chenda, a powerful drum played with sticks. Chendas were originally played in the outdoor temple ceremonies to accompany shadow puppets.
 Two singers, the Ponnikkaran and the Sinkidikkaran, were introduced to add the Thiranukuu. Thiranukuu is a method of introducing the evil characters of the play to the audience from behind a large satin curtain, held up at the front of the stage.

Legacy
 T. Raman Nambeesan (1888–1983) wrote a historical novel called Keralesvaran (1926) about a ruler of Tanur.
 Chandrika Vithi'' written by Muriyanattu Nampyar mentions a Vettathu raja called Viraraya of Prakasa Kingdom'.

See also
 Valluvanadu
 Ponnani
 Zamorin of Calicut

References

External links

 About the Codakkal Tile Factory

Dynasties of India
History of Kerala
Nair
Former countries in South Asia
Former monarchies of South Asia
Historical Indian regions
Empires and kingdoms of India
1766 disestablishments
Indian monarchs
Geography of Kerala
Malappuram district
History of Malappuram district
Regions of Kerala
Portuguese India
Feudal states of Kerala
1571 in India